Bernardo Guerra Serna (1 December 1930 – 26 July 2021) was a Colombian politician who served as a Senator.

References

1930 births
2021 deaths
Colombian politicians
Presidents of the Senate of Colombia
Members of the Senate of Colombia
Colombian Liberal Party politicians
Free University of Colombia alumni
Universidad de Medellín alumni
People from Antioquia Department
20th-century Colombian people